A Bachelor of Medicine, Bachelor of Surgery (abbreviated most commonly MBBS, but also BMBS, MB ChB, MB BCh and MB BChir) is a undergraduate medical degree awarded by medical schools in countries that follow the tradition of the United Kingdom. The historical degree nomenclature states that they are two separate undergraduate degrees. In practice, however, they are usually combined as one and conferred together, and may also be awarded at graduate-level medical schools. It usually takes five to six years to complete this degree.

A Bachelor of Medicine (MB, also BM, BMed) is the primary medical degree awarded by medical schools in China and some medical schools in Australia and UK. It usually takes five years to complete. These medical graduates with an MB degree can still practice surgery.

Both medical degrees are considered MD-equivalent in US universities and medical institutions. In North America, the equivalent medical degree is awarded as Doctor of Medicine (MD) or Doctor of Osteopathic Medicine (DO)—the latter in the United States only.

History and nature 
The degree is currently awarded in institutions in the UK and countries formerly part of the British Empire.

Historically, Bachelor of Medicine was also the primary medical degree conferred by institutions in the United States and Canada, such as the University of Pennsylvania, Harvard, the University of Toronto, the University of Maryland, and Columbia. Several early North American medical schools were (for the most part) founded by physicians and surgeons who had trained in England and Scotland. University medical education in England culminated with the Bachelor of Medicine qualification and in Scotland the Doctor of Medicine. In the mid-19th century, the public bodies that regulated medical practice required practitioners in Scotland and England to hold the dual Bachelor of Medicine and Bachelor of Surgery degrees. Throughout the 19th century, North American medical schools switched to the tradition of the ancient universities of Scotland and began conferring Doctor of Medicine rather than Bachelor of Medicine.

In the countries that award bachelor's degrees in medicine, however, Doctor of Medicine denotes a holder of a junior doctorate and is reserved for medical practitioners who undertake research and submit a thesis in the field of medicine. Nevertheless, those holding Bachelor of Medicine, Bachelor of Surgery are usually referred to by the courtesy title of "Doctor" and use the prefix "Dr.", whether or not they also hold a Ph.D. or DSc. In theory, the right to the use of the title "Doctor" is conferred on the medical graduate when he or she is registered as a medical practitioner by the relevant professional body, not by the possession of the MBBS degrees.

In many countries, the degrees are awarded after an undergraduate course lasting five or six years. For example, most Chinese universities offering medical degrees provide undergraduate courses lasting six years. In some cases, a graduate in another discipline may subsequently enter a special graduate-entry medical course, reduced in duration to account for relevant material covered or learning skills acquired during the first degree. In some cases the old first-year courses (for six-year degrees) in the basic sciences of physics, chemistry, and biology have been abolished: that standard has to be reached by school examinations before entry. However, in most countries, a newly graduated Bachelor of Medicine and Surgery must spend a specified period in internship before he or she can obtain full registration as a licensed medical practitioner.

Naming

The names and abbreviations given to these degrees depend on the institution, awarding body or country, and vary widely. This is mostly for reasons of tradition rather than to indicate any difference between the relative levels of the degrees. They are considered equivalent.

If the awarding body titles the degrees in Latin, the degrees are commonly named Medicinae Baccalaureus, Chirurgiae Baccalaureus; Medicinae Baccalaureus et Chirurgiae Baccalaureus; or Baccalaureus in Medicina et in Chirurgia; abbreviated as MB ChB, MB BCh or otherwise. If titled in English, they are named Bachelor of Medicine, Bachelor of Surgery; Bachelor of Medicine and Bachelor of Surgery; or Bachelor of Medicine and Surgery; usually abbreviated as MB BS, and sometimes as BM BS, even though most MB BS-awarding institutions do not use Latin to name their degrees.

Below are described the specific names used, arranged by country.

Australia

Historically, Australian medical schools have followed the British tradition by conferring the degrees of Bachelor of Medicine and Bachelor of Surgery (MBBS) to its graduates whilst reserving the title of Doctor of Medicine (MD) for their research training degree, analogous to the PhD, or for their honorary doctorates. Although the majority of Australian MBBS degrees have been graduate programs since the 1990s, under the previous Australian Qualifications Framework (AQF) they remained categorised as Level 7 Bachelor's degrees together with other undergraduate programs.

The latest version of the AQF includes the new category of Level 9 Master's (Extended) degrees which permits the use of the term 'Doctor' in the styling of the degree title of relevant professional programs. As a result, most Australian medical schools have replaced their MBBS degrees with the MD to resolve the previous anomalous nomenclature. With the introduction of the Master's level MD, universities have also renamed their previous medical research doctorates. The University of Melbourne was the first to introduce the MD in 2011 as a basic medical degree, and has renamed its research degree to Doctor of Medical Science (DMedSc).

Bahrain
The Medical University of Bahrain or RCSI-Bahrain is a constituent university of the Royal College of Surgeons in Ireland (RCSI)  and awards its graduates the MB, BCh, BAO (Hons), the same degree awarded to graduates at RCSI.

Bangladesh
All medical schools in Bangladesh award MBBS.

Barbados 
The Bridgetown International University, Victoria University of Barbados, American University of Barbados School of Medicine, University of the West Indies Faculty of Medicine all award the MBBS

China
In China, medical undergraduates are awarded a Bachelor of Medicine (MB, also BMed and BM) for a course of study lasting five years for native Chinese students and six years for international/foreign students, including internship. International students may take the program in English or Chinese. Some medical schools also award  MBBS degrees, but only for International students total, 247 Universities are authorized to award medical degrees. 
In fact, in China, only English medium universities are legally allowed to teach foreign students in English by the Ministry of Education (MOE), and these universities are also called “MOE Listed Universities”, only these universities can offer programs for M.B.B.S degrees as well.
Around 180 Universities offer only Chinese medium MB courses and 67 offer both English medium MBBS and Chinese medium MB. All 247 Universities are recognized by most of the medical councils around the world and by ECFMG. Until August 2022, 136 Universities have passed the accreditation by Accreditation of Medical Education in of Ministry of Education of China.Directory of Accredited School in Clinical Medicine - 教育部临床医学专业认证工作委员会 The universities awarding MB and MBBS degrees are at List.

Hong Kong
The awarding of qualifications in Hong Kong follows the British tradition.
The dual degree is awarded as:
 MBBS at The University of Hong Kong; and
 MBChB at The Chinese University of Hong Kong.

Egypt
All Egyptian medical schools, public and private, award an MB BCh as the basic medical degree after completion of five academic and clinical study years followed by two years of obligatory clinical rotations (the MB BCh is issued only after the completion of the clinical rotations) with total of seven years both academic, clinical study and clinical rotations.

Rwanda
All Rwandan medical schools, public and private, award an MBBS as the basic medical degree after completion of five or six academic years. 
University of Rwanda Faculty of Medicine 
University of Gitwe
University of Global Health Equity

France
French students get permitted access to medical studies when succeeding the competitive examination occurring at the end of their first year of studies. They spend their second and third year at their medical school where they learn physiology, semiology and the basics of medical examination. From their fourth year, they begin their rotations in teaching hospitals where they assist junior and senior physicians and learn their art. At the end of their sixth year, they undertake a competitive examination to match with their medical specialty and city of practice. Students are then full-time physicians practising under supervision and will be called "doctors" only when graduating at the end of their residency.

Ghana
All Ghanaian medical schools award an MBChB as the basic medical degree after 6 academic years. These seven medical schools are Kwame Nkrumah University of Science and Technology, University of Ghana, University for Development Studies, University of Cape Coast, University of Health and Allied Sciences and the private Accra College of Medicine, and Family Health Medical School, another private medical school.

Guyana
The University of Guyana awards MB BS. Other "offshore" United-States-linked schools in the country award the North American MD, such as Texila American University, Lincoln American University.

India
In India the full-form of MBBS is Bachelor of Medicine, Bachelor of Surgery. It is generally a 5.5 year course including one year compulsory internship, that can be completed from a college accredited by the National Medical Commission, to receive a degree titled MBBS (Medical colleges in India). Medical colleges may also teach Post Graduate as well as Paramedical courses. Admission to M.B.B.S programme in government colleges can be highly competitive because of subsidized education and extensive hands-on experience.

The MBBS course starts with the basic pre and para-clinical subjects such as biochemistry, physiology, anatomy, microbiology, pathology, forensic medicine including toxicology and pharmacology. The students simultaneously obtain hands-on training in the wards and out-patient departments, where they interact with real patients for five years. The curriculum aims to inculcate standard protocols of history taking, examination, differential diagnosis and complete patient Management. The student is taught to determine what investigations will be useful for a patient and what are the best treatment options. The curriculum also contains a thorough practical knowledge and practice of performing standard clinical procedures. The course also contains a 12-month-long internship, in which an intern is rotated across various specialties. Besides standard clinical care, one also gets a thorough experience of ward management, staff management, and thorough counselling skills.

The degree awarded is "Bachelor of Medicine and Bachelor of Surgery". The minimum requirements for the MBBS course are 50% marks in physics, chemistry, biology and English in a student's secondary school examinations – usually, under the Council for Indian School Certificate Examinations, the Central Board of Secondary Education or curricula established by the several states. For 'Reserved Category' students, the requirement is 40%. MBBS admissions for both public and private institutions are centralised under the National Medical Commission , whereby a student is eligible for admission to an institution based on their 'All India Rank' in the National Eligibility and Entrance Test conducted by the National Testing Agency. The All India Institute of Medical Sciences at New Delhi is widely regarded as India's most prestigious undergraduate medical college, with admissions being highly competitive. The Government of India has recently announced plans to establish new medical colleges in 58 districts, which will add 5,800 seats to the country's annual MBBS student intake.

Indonesia
In Indonesia, graduating students are awarded the academic degree of Sarjana Kedokteran / Bachelor of Medicine (written as suffix "S.Ked") after completing their pre-clinical studies. At this point, the graduate is not yet a practising doctor, but may choose to work directly as a medical scientist or other non-clinician professions (usually health-related). However, most graduates will pursue the conventional path, which is to enroll in the clinical clerkship program (Program Pendidikan Profesi Dokter) for another 1.5 to 2 years. During this program, students are required to rotate through different medical/surgical specialties in a teaching hospital, actively involved in diagnoses and treatment of patients under direct supervision of residents and consultants/attending physicians. After completing clinical clerkship, students take national medical licensing examination (Ujian Kompetensi Mahasiswa Program Profesi Dokter/UKMPPD) and will be awarded with the title Dokter (written as prefix "dr.") as first professional title if they pass the examination.

Iraq
All medical schools in Iraq award MB ChB. With the exception of University of Kurdistan-Hewlêr, which awards the "MBBS" degree.

Ireland
The medical schools in both the Republic of Ireland and Northern Ireland – Queen's University Belfast, the University of Dublin (Trinity College), some constituent institutions of the National University of Ireland (University College Dublin, University College Cork and NUI Galway), and the Royal College of Surgeons in Ireland— award the degrees of MB BCh BAO. The letters BAO stand for Baccalaureus in Arte Obstetricia (Bachelor of Obstetrics), a degree unique to Ireland which the Irish universities added in the 19th century as the legislation at the time insisted on a final examination in obstetrics. This third degree is an anachronism which is not registerable with the Irish Medical Council nor the British General Medical Council (GMC). The only exception is the newly established University of Limerick graduate entry school of medicine which awards BM BS for Bachelor of Medicine and Bachelor of Surgery.

At the University of Dublin the preclinical course leads to an additional Bachelor of Arts (BA) degree (upgradable after three or four years to Master of Arts); as originally after this most students used to go elsewhere to complete clinical training.

LRCPI LRCSI, or simply LRCP&SI, denotes a holder of the historical non-university qualifying licentiates awarded jointly by the Royal College of Physicians of Ireland and the Royal College of Surgeons in Ireland to students of the RCSI's medical school under the Irish Conjoint Scheme. Unlike the corresponding licentiates awarded by the Royal Colleges in Scotland and England (which were external qualifications), these qualifications are still registerable with the Irish Medical Council, but not with the British GMC. Students at RCSI still receive these licences but now also receive the degrees MB BCh BAO, due to RCSI's status as a recognised college of the National University of Ireland. The RCSI students received a Licence in Midwifery (LM) from each college, in the same way that the Irish universities granted BAO degrees, so their qualifications were sometimes expressed as L & LM, RCPI, L & LM, RCSI or more misleadingly as LLM, LRCPI LRCSI, or simply LRCP&SI.LAH formerly denoted a licentiate of the Apothecaries' Hall of Ireland, and is no longer awarded.

Japan
In Japan, medical undergraduates are awarded a Bachelor of Medicine, a course of study lasting six years. It is awarded by 42 national, 8 public and 31 private universities.

Jordan
The Bachelor of Medicine and Surgery (MBBS) degree is awarded in Jordan by:
Jordan University of Science and Technology
University of Jordan
Mutah University
Yarmouk University
Al Balqa Applied University

Kenya
The national universities with medical faculties in Kenya, namely Jomo Kenyatta University of Agriculture and Technology, University of Nairobi, Moi University, Kenyatta University, Egerton University, Maseno University and Kenya Methodist University award MB ChB.

Mount Kenya University and Egerton University also award the four-year BSc. Clinical Medicine degree in addition to the six-year MBChB.

Libya
There are three major public medical universities in Libya, University of Tripoli (Tripoli), University of Benghazi (formerly Garyounis) (Benghazi), and University of Alzaweyah. The schools award the MBBCh.

The Libyan International Medical University is an accredited private medical university that awards an MBChB to its graduates.

Malaysia
The MBBS is awarded by five public and 17 private universities:

Public
Universiti Malaya (UM) – October 1949
 International Islamic University Malaysia (UIAM/IIUM) – May 1995
Universiti Teknologi MARA (UiTM) – June 2003
Universiti Sains Islam Malaysia (USIM) – July 2005
Universiti Sultan Zainal Abidin (UniSZA) – July 2009

Private
Quest International University Perak
Widad University College - previously known as University College Shahputra
International Medical University (IMU) – February 1999
RCSI & UCD Malaysia Campus – 2001
Asian Institute of Medicine, Science & Technology University – May 2001
Monash University Malaysia Campus – February 2007
Universiti Kuala Lumpur (UniKL-RCMP) – July 2008
Melaka Manipal Medical College (MMMC)
Cyberjaya University College of Medical Sciences (CUCMS)
Management & Science University – International Medical School (MSU-IMS)
MAHSA University College
Taylor's University College
Newcastle University Medicine Malaysia
Universiti Tunku Abdul Rahman (UTAR)
Masterskill University College of Health Sciences (MUCH)
SEGI University College
Insaniah University College
UCSI University

Mexico
In Mexico, the National Autonomous University of Mexico, the Monterrey Institute of Technology and Higher Education, the National Polytechnic Institute, the Metropolitan Autonomous University, among others, grant the title of "Médico cirujano" (Physician-surgeon) after five or six years of post-high school education, plus one year of internship and one year of social service depending on each institution.

Myanmar
All five medical schools (UM1, UM 2, DSMA, UMM, UMMG) in Myanmar award MB BS.
UMTG(2015)

Namibia
The University of Namibia UNAM School of Medicine, the only medical school in the country, awards the MBChB degree.

Netherlands
In the Netherlands, students follow a period of 6 academic years of which 2–4 years is internships. After 6 years, students obtain the titles MSc and Medical Doctor (MD).

Nigeria
The MBBS/MB ChB is awarded by many public and private universities in Nigeria, after a period of 6 academic years.

Public University
Obafemi Awolowo University (OAU) 1961.
Bayero University Kano (BUK) 4 October 1975.
University of Ibadan (UNIIBADAN) 1948.
Ahmadu Bello University (ABU) Zaria 4 October 1962.
Ambrose Alli University (AAU) Ekpoma 1981.
University of Nigeria (NSUKKA) 7 October 1960.
University of Lagos (UNILAG) 1962.
University of Port Harcourt (UNIPORT) 1975.
University of Calabar (UNICAL) 1975.
University of Benin (UNIBEN) 1973.
Abubakar Tafawa Balewa (ATBU) 1980.
University of Maiduguri (UNIMAID) 1975.
Usmanu Danfodiyo University (UDU) 1975.
University of Ilorin (UNILORIN) 1975.
Lagos State University (LASU) 1983.
Rivers State University (RSU)
1972.
Federal University, Birnin Kebbi (FUBK) 18 February 2013.
Yusuf Maitama Sule University (UMSUK) Kano.

Nepal
There are 18 medical schools in Nepal that award the MBBS degree. Nepal Medical Council (NMC) is the regulatory board that gives recognition to medical institutions for providing formal studies in medical science and training.

Kathmandu University (KU) and affiliated colleges
 Kathmandu University, School of Medical Sciences (KUSMS), Dhulikhel, Kavre
 Manipal College of Medical Sciences (MCOMS), Pokhara, Kaski
 College of Medical Sciences (COMS), Bharatpur, Chitwan
 Kathmandu Medical College (KMC), Sinamangal, Kathmandu
 Nepal Medical College (NMC), Jorpati, Kathmandu
 Nepalgunj Medical College (NGMC), Chisapani, Nepalgunj
 Lumbini Medical College (LMC), Tansen, Palpa
 Nobel Medical College, Biratnagar
 Birat Medical college, Biratnagar
Devdaha Medical college, Rupendehi

Tribhuvan University (TU) and affiliated colleges
 Tribhuvan University, Institute of Medicine (IOM), Maharajgunj, Kathmandu
 Nepalese Army Institute of Health Sciences, College of Medicine, Kathmandu
 Universal College of Medical Sciences (UCMS), Bhairawaha
 National Medical College, Birgunj
 Janaki Medical College, Janakpur
 KIST Medical College, Imadol, Lalitpur
 Chitwan Medical College (CMC), Bharatpur, Chitwan
 Gandaki Medical College (GMCTHRC), Pokhara, Kaski

Medical schools not affiliated to universities or having their own board
 B.P. Koirala Institute of Health Sciences, Ghopa, Dharan
 Patan Academy of Health Sciences -School of Medicine, Patan, Lalitpur
Karnali Institute of Health Science, Jumla
National Academy of Medical Sciences, Kathmandu is an NMC-recognized medical college that has post-graduate residency (MD/MS) training programs but does not award MBBS degree.

New Zealand
The two New Zealand medical schools, Auckland and Otago, style their degrees as "MBChB" and "MB ChB" respectively.

Pakistan

In Pakistan, a medical school is more often referred to as a medical college. The full-form of MBBS is Bachelor of Medicine, Bachelor of Surgery. It is a 5-year course plus one-year internship in affiliated hospital that can be completed from a college recognized by the Pakistan Medical Commission, to receive a degree titled MBBS (Medical colleges in Pakistan). Medical colleges may also teach Post Graduate courses such as FCPS and diplomas. A medical college is affiliated with a university as a department which usually has a separate campus. Currently, there is a total of 114 medical colleges in Pakistan, 44 of which are public and 70 private. All but two colleges are listed in International Medical Education Directory.

All medical colleges and universities are regulated by the respective provincial department of health. They, however, have to be recognised after meeting criteria set by a central regulatory authority called Pakistan Medical Commission (PMC). Entrance into the medical colleges is based on merit under the guidelines of PMC. Both the academic performance at the HSSC (grades 11–12) and a centralized entrance test like NMDCAT, are taken into consideration for the eligibility to enter most of the medical colleges.

To get admission into any government medical college, the weightage is determined by the provincial or federal government. In order to get admission into any private medical college, the following weightage is used:
 50% to Marks of entrance test like National Medical and Dental College Admission Test (NMDCAT).
 30% to Marks of Higher Secondary School Certificate (HSSC) Pre-Medical.
20% to Marks obtained in the Interview conducted by Private Colleges.

Saudi Arabia
Medical schools in Saudi Arabia award the MBBS.

Singapore
The Yong Loo Lin School of Medicine at the National University of Singapore and the Lee Kong Chian School of Medicine at Nanyang Technological University confer MB BS. The American Duke University has a medical programme based in Singapore (Duke-NUS Graduate Medical School), but it follows the North American model of styling its degree Doctor of Medicine (MD) at master's degree level.

Somalia
Amoud University, Benadir University Salaam University and Hargeisa University award the MB ChB, East Africa University awards MMBS.

South Africa

The University of Pretoria, University of Cape Town, University of the Free State, University of Stellenbosch, University of KwaZulu-Natal, Walter Sisulu University and MEDUNSA all award MBChB, whereas the University of the Witwatersrand styles its degree as MBBCh.

South Sudan
The University of Juba, University of Bahr El-Ghazal and Upper Nile University in South Sudan awards the MBBS degree after the successful completion of six academic years.

Sri Lanka
In 1942, the University of Ceylon was established through legislation and the MBBS degree was recognised for registration of doctors in place of the Licentiate in Medicine and Surgery (LMS).

Sudan
The medical degree in Sudan is a six-year program that includes both classroom and clinical training. Students who successfully complete the program are awarded the Bachelor of Medicine, Bachelor of Surgery (MBBS) degree, which is recognized internationally.

Syria
The higher education in Syria provides training to a Diploma, Bachelor, Master, and Doctorate levels (see European Education, Audiovisual and Culture Executive Agency on Higher Education: Syria).

Tunisia
Medical education in Tunisia is solely administered by the government Ministry of Higher Education and Ministry of Public Health. Students get permitted access to medical studies when succeeding their national baccalauréat exam and obtaining a competitive score that allows them admission to medical schools (usually in the 95% percentile). The training takes a minimum of nine years after the baccalauréat and concludes with a thesis. Upon successful presentation of their thesis, the medical student is awarded a Diploma of Doctorate in Medecine (Diplôme de Doctorat en Médecine). Further certification is based on their specialty.

Students spend their first, second year at their medical school where they learn physiology, semiology and the basics of medical examination. From their fourth year, they begin their rotations in teaching hospitals where they assist junior and senior physicians and learn their art. At the end of their fifth year, they undertake a competitive examination to match with their medical specialty and city of practice. Students are then full-time physicians practising under supervision and will be called "doctors" only when graduating at the end of their residency.

Ukraine
In Ukraine, the full-form of MBBS is Bachelor of Medicine and Bachelor of Surgery. It is generally a 5.8 year course including one year compulsory internship, that can be completed from a college accredited by the National Medical Commission. At present, Ukraine is ranked at the fourth position in Europe for having the largest number of post graduates in fields of medicine. Ukraine has a number of Top Government Medical Universities offering MBBS, MD and other degrees in medicine to the local students as well as international students. Some of the Top Ukraine Universities for nationals and international students are:
Bukovinian State Medical University
Kharkiv National Medical University
Kharkiv International Medical University
VN Karazin Kharkiv National University 
Kyiv Medical University of UAFM 
Vinnytsia National Medical University. N. I. Pirogov 
 Petro Mohyla Black Sea National University
 Bogomolets National Medical University
 Cherkasy National University
 Danylo Halytsky Lviv National Medical University
 Dnipropetrovsk State Medical Academy
Donetsk National Medical University
International European University
 Ivano-Frankivsk National Medical University
Odessa International Medical University
 Poltava State Medical and Dental University
 Uzhhorod National University, Faculty of Medicine
 Taras Shevchenko National University
 Ternopil National Medical University
 Sumy State Medical University

The MBBS course starts with the basic pre and para-clinical subjects such as biochemistry, physiology, anatomy, microbiology, pathology, forensic medicine including toxicology and pharmacology. The students simultaneously obtain hands-on training in the wards and out-patient departments, where they interact with real patients for six years. The curriculum aims to inculcate standard protocols of history taking, examination, differential diagnosis and complete patient Management. The student is taught to determine what investigations will be useful for a patient and what are the best treatment options. The curriculum also contains a thorough practical knowledge and practice of performing standard clinical procedures. The course also contains a 12-month-long internship, in which an intern is rotated across various specialties. Besides standard clinical care, one also gets a thorough experience of ward management, staff management, and thorough counselling skills.
The degree awarded is "Bachelor of Medicine and Bachelor of Surgery". The minimum requirements for the MBBS course are 50% marks in physics, chemistry, biology and English in a student's secondary school examinations and student need to pass National Eligibility cum Entrance Test examination for the admission in Ukraine Universities.

Uganda
The nine universities in Uganda that have medical schools that teach undergraduate courses, namely; Makerere University, Mbarara University, Gulu University, Kampala International University, Busitema University, Kabale University, Habib Medical School, St. Augustine International University, and Uganda Christian University all award the MBChB degree, after five years of study.

 United Kingdom 
England, Wales and Northern Ireland
While first degrees in medicine meet the expectations of the descriptor for higher education qualification at "level 7 (the UK master's degree)", these degrees usually retain, for historical reasons, "Bachelor of Medicine, Bachelor of Surgery" and are abbreviated to MBChB or MBBS.

Varied abbreviations are used for these degrees in these areas:MB ChB is used at the universities of Aston, Anglia Ruskin, Birmingham, Bristol, Buckingham, Lancaster, Leeds, Leicester, Liverpool, Keele, Manchester, Sheffield, Sunderland (in partnership with Keele) and Warwick.MB BCh is used by the Welsh universities, Cardiff University and Swansea University.MB, BCh, BAO is used at the Queen's University, BelfastMB BS is used at all medical schools currently or previously part of the University of London (aka The United Hospitals) (Imperial College School of Medicine, UCL Medical School, King's College London School of Medicine, Barts and The London School of Medicine and St George's, University of London), Norwich Medical School, Hull York Medical School, Newcastle University, University of Central Lancashire and Ulster University (which is currently partnered with St George's) BM BCh is awarded by the University of Oxford.BM BS is used at the University of Nottingham, University of Exeter, University of Plymouth, University of Southampton, Kent and Medway Medical School and Brighton and Sussex Medical School (formerly at Peninsula College of Medicine and Dentistry)BM was previously awarded at the University of Southampton. However, beginning in 2013 students have been awarded BMBS. Although no degree in surgery was formally awarded by Southampton, this degree was equivalent to the MB ChB; students may go on to a career in surgery the same as any other graduates in medicine and surgery.MB BChir is awarded by the University of Cambridge.

At the universities of Oxford and Cambridge, the preclinical course leads to an additional Bachelor of Arts (BA), degree (upgradable after three or four years to Master of Arts), after which most students used to go elsewhere (but usually to one of the London teaching hospitals) to complete clinical training. They could then take the degrees of their new university: They used to have the options of returning to their old university to take the clinical examinations or taking one of the old non-university qualifying examinations. Most students at Oxford and Cambridge now remain in place to take their clinical training.

Scotland
All medical schools in Scotland (Aberdeen, Dundee, Edinburgh and Glasgow) award MB ChB.

The University of St Andrews School of Medicine awarded MB ChB until the early 1970s, but since the incorporation of its clinical medical school into the University of Dundee, St Andrews now only awards a pre-clinical BSc or BSc (Hons), and students go to a Partner Medical School (Aberdeen, Dundee, Edinburgh, Glasgow, or Manchester), where they are awarded an MB ChB after a further three years' study. There is also a programe for Canadian Citizens and residents whereby they complete 3 years at St. Andrews, then 3 years at Edinburgh and are assisted with applying for residency back in Canada.

Since 2018, a joint initiative coordinated by both the Universities of St Andrews and Dundee, the Scottish Graduate Entry Medicine (ScotGEM) programme, has based its first and second year students at St Andrews, and its third and fourth year students at Dundee. This is Scotland's first graduate entry medical degree programme. The intention is that the students of the inaugural cohort, due to graduate in July 2022, will be conferred a joint MB ChB by both universities - the first to graduate with this professional degree directly from St Andrews in over fifty years

The Scottish Triple Qualification of LRCPE, LRCSE, LRCPSG (earlier LRCPE, LRCSE, LRFPSG) is an old non-university qualifying examination in medicine and surgery awarded jointly by the Royal College of Physicians of Edinburgh, Royal College of Surgeons of Edinburgh and Royal College of Physicians and Surgeons of Glasgow, previously through a Conjoint Board and from 1994 through the United Examining Board. The UEB was dissolved in 2007. These qualifications are still registrable with the GMC, but permission to award them was withdrawn by the Privy Council of the UK in 1999.

 Historical Primary Medical Qualifications 
The Conjoint diplomas LRCP MRCS LMSSA were non-university qualifying examinations in medicine and surgery awarded jointly by the Royal College of Physicians of London, Royal College of Surgeons of England and Society of Apothecaries through the United Examining Board from 1994 until 1999, when the General Medical Council withdrew permission. Before 1994, the English Conjoint diploma of LRCP, MRCS was awarded for 110 years, and the LMSSA was a distinct and sometimes less-esteemed qualification. These diplomas slowly became less popular among British medical students, but as recently as 1938 only a half of them qualified with university degrees. The diplomas came to be taken mostly by those who had already qualified in medicine overseas or who failed their medical school finals.

United States

International medical graduates with an MBBS from foreign countries are generally exempt from having to attend medical school in the United States, but must still undergo medical training and pass the USMLE. The MBBS is not offered at medical schools in the United States as the majority of medical school programs are graduate entry and by tradition offer the MD degree as a primary medical qualification.

There are a number of institutions in the United States that offer a combined BS-MD joint degree, notably Northeast Ohio Medical University whereby graduating high school seniors complete an accelerated bachelor's degree in two years followed by an MD at the traditional four year pace. Although the BS, MD pathway is a hybrid undergraduate/graduate program, the result is a primary medical qualification equivalent to an MBBS degree and graduates of these schools go on to enter their intern year at roughly the same age as their UK counterparts.
 
Traditionally US educated MDs and DOs go through four years of an undergraduate degree with a competitive GPA and then apply to a professional medical graduate school. They then study four more years of medical sciences while doing clinical rotations and going through three USMLE exams. Then if selected for a residency, they continue for a minimum of three to eight years in their specialty where they are officially licensed to practice after completion.

After completion of a four-year undergraduate degree and the MCAT, a candidate can apply to a graduate MSTP (Medical Science Training Program/ MD-PhD ) which is eight additional years of education and a minimum of three years of residency training.

Most MBBS physicians visiting or practicing in United States use the designation of MD for various personal and professional reasons, but laws may change to require full disclosure when presenting as a clinical practitioner for litigious reasons. The MD title is distinctly used in the US for physicians who earned their medical degree in the US who practice evidence based medicine. They separate themselves from DOs who go through a different type of education and training which focuses on the patient as a whole and an array of treatments inclusive of medicine and surgery as well.

Vietnam
There are many medical schools in Vietnam, such as Hanoi Medical University, Vietnam University of Traditional Medicine, and Hue University of Medicine and Pharmacy. Most of them require six years to receive a Doctor of Medicine degree.

West Indies
All constituent countries of the University of the West Indies (UWI) confer MB BS, due to the historical affiliation of UWI to the University of London. The three physical campuses are Mona in Jamaica, Saint Augustine in Trinidad and Tobago, and Cave Hill in Barbados, with each campus having a Medical Faculty.
The University of Guyana (UG) also confers "MB BS" to their medical school graduates. There are other medical schools in the West Indies, but these follow the North-American system leading to MD''.

Zambia
All schools in Zambia that award the MBChB degree:

Government sponsored medical schools:
University of Zambia (UNZA)
Copperbelt University (CBU)
Mulungushi University (MU)
Levy Mwanawasa Medical University (LMMU)
Private sponsored medical schools:
Cavendish University Zambia (CUZ)
 Eden University
Lusaka Apex Medical University (LAMU)
University of Lusaka (UNILUS)
Texila American University (TAU)

Zimbabwe
The University of Zimbabwe College of Health Sciences (UZ-CHS) awards the MBChB degree. Midlands State University (MSU) also offers the MBChB degree. While the National University of Science and Technology (NUST) awards the MBBS.

Liberia
The AM. Dogliotti College of Medicine (University of Libeira) awards the MD degree.

Classification
Medical degrees differ from other undergraduate degrees in that they are professional qualifications that lead holders to enter a particular career upon receipt. This is not the case with most other undergraduate degrees, so whilst the Bachelor of Medicine and Bachelor of Surgery are undergraduate or graduate degrees (depending on the institution), they are perhaps more accurately conceptualised as a so-called first professional degree. Other professions whose qualifications follow a similar pattern include:
Dentistry
Education
Engineering
Environmental Health
Occupational Therapy
Optometry
Pharmacy
Physical Therapy
Clinical Psychology
Law
Veterinary Medicine
Osteopathy
Physician Assistant
Nursing

Bachelor of Medicine, Bachelor of Surgery are usually awarded as professional degrees, not as honours degrees, and as such the graduate is not classified as for honours degrees in other subjects. However, at many institutions (for example the University of Aberdeen, University of Birmingham, University of Sheffield, University of Liverpool, University of Leicester, Hull York Medical School, and University of Manchester in England, Queen's University Belfast in Northern Ireland, Cardiff University in Wales and the University of Dundee in Scotland), it is possible for the degrees to be awarded with Honours (i.e. MB ChB (Hons.)) or with Commendation, if the board of examiners recognises exceptional performance throughout the degree course. Very few of these are awarded.

More often, it is possible to study one subject for an extra year for an intercalated honours degree. This is usually a Bachelor of Science (BSc), Bachelor of Medical Science (BMedSci), Bachelor of Medical Biology (BMedBiol) or similar: at Oxford and Cambridge in England and Dublin in Ireland Bachelor of Arts degrees are awarded. At a few universities most medical students obtain an ordinary degree in science as well: when the University of Edinburgh had a six-year course, the third year was followed by the award of an ordinary BSc(MedSci). In Australia, The University of Melbourne in Australia offers an Arts Degree (BA) to a medical student on the completion of two extra years of undergraduate study, and Monash University offers a law degree (LLB); if the optional law degree is undertaken, on completion of their degree the student may choose to do a one-year internship at a hospital and become a doctor, or spend one year doing articles to practise thereafter as a lawyer. At the University of Nottingham and the University of Southampton, both in England, all medical students on the five-year course obtain a Bachelor of Medical Sciences (BMedSci) degree without an extra intercalated year. At the University of Cambridge, Imperial College London and University College London, certain medical students are able to extend their intercalated year to an extra three years, thus temporarily exiting the MBBS course to complete a PhD. Upon completion of the PhD, the student is required to sit the remaining 2 years of the medicine course to receive his/her MBBS degree. The University of the West Indies, Mona in Kingston, Jamaica automatically awards a Bachelor of Medical Sciences (BMedSci) degree to all students who have successfully completed three years of their MBBS programme.

Progression
Medical school graduates are only entitled to use the courtesy title "Doctor" upon registration as a medical practitioner with the relevant regulatory body in their respective country. Medical graduates are eligible to sit postgraduate examinations, including examinations for membership and fellowship of professional institutions. Among the latter are the Membership of the Royal College of Surgeons, postgraduate master's degrees (such as a Master of Surgery or Master of Medicine), and a postgraduate doctorate in medicine (such as Doctor of Medicine or Doctor of Science, if earned in Ireland, the UK or Commonwealth nations, and board certification examinations).

See also

 Bachelor of Ayurveda, Medicine and Surgery
 Bachelor of Unani Medicine and Surgery
 Bachelor's degree
 Doctor of Medicine
 Doctor of Osteopathic Medicine
 Homologation
 List of medical schools
 Master of Medicine
 Master of Surgery
 Medical education
 Medical school

References

Academic degrees in healthcare
Academic degrees of India
Bachelor's degrees
Medical degrees